The 1997 Singapore Open (also known as the Konica Cup) was a five-star badminton tournament that took place at the Singapore Indoor Stadium in Singapore, from July 21 to July 27, 1997. The total prize money on offer was US$170,000.

Venue
Singapore Indoor Stadium

Final results

References

Singapore Open (badminton)
Singapore
1997 in Singaporean sport